
Gmina Górowo Iławeckie is a rural gmina (administrative district) in Bartoszyce County, Warmian-Masurian Voivodeship, in northern Poland, on the border with Russia. Its seat is the town of Górowo Iławeckie, although the town is not part of the territory of the gmina.

Villages
Gmina Górowo Iławeckie contains the villages and settlements of Augamy, Bądle, Bądze, Bukowiec, Czyprki, Dęby, Deksyty, Dobrzynka, Dulsin, Dwórzno, Dzikowo Iławeckie, Gałajny, Galiny, Glądy, Gniewkowo, Grądzik, Grotowo, Gruszyny, Janikowo, Kamińsk, Kandyty, Kanie Iławeckie, Kiwajny, Krasnołąka, Kumkiejmy, Kumkiejmy Przednie, Lipniki, Lisiak, Malinowo, Nerwiki, Nowa Karczma, Nowa Wieś Iławecka, Okopek, Orsy, Paprocina, Pareżki, Paustry, Piaseczno, Piasek, Piasty Wielkie, Pieszkowo, Powiersze, Pudlikajmy, Reszkowo, Robity, Sągnity, Sigajny, Skarbiec, Sołtysowizna, Stabławki, Stega Mała, Toprzyny, Wągniki, Wągródka, Warszkajty, Weskajmy, Wiewiórki, Włodkowo, Wojmiany, Wokiele, Worławki, Wormie, Worszyny, Woryny, Zięby, Zielenica, Żołędnik and Żywkowo.

Neighbouring gminas
Gmina Górowo Iławeckie is bordered by the town of Górowo Iławeckie and by the gminas of Bartoszyce, Lelkowo, Lidzbark Warmiński and Pieniężno. It also borders Russia (Kaliningrad oblast).

References

Gorowo Ilaweckie
Bartoszyce County